The 1874 Oregon gubernatorial election took place on June 1, 1874 to elect the governor of the U.S. state of Oregon. The election matched Republican J. C. Tolman against Democratic incumbent La Fayette Grover and independent Thomas Franklin Campbell.

Results

References

 http://ncbible.org/nwh/ProCampTF.html

Gubernatorial
1874
Oregon
June 1874 events